White Head Island is an island located in the Bay of Fundy. It is off the east coast of Grand Manan Island, New Brunswick. In 2011 the island had a population of 162. White Head Island is governed as a local service district.

Its economy is based largely around aquaculture and fishing.

The island has an elementary school which has kindergarten to grade 2 and grades 3 to 6 in two separate classrooms.  Recently there have been efforts to move children to the larger Grand Manan Community School however  the younger grades remain on White Head due to the ferry crossing.  It's the smallest school within the Anglophone South School District of Southern New Brunswick.

Coastal Transport Limited provides car ferry service between White Head and Grand Manan.  The ferry William Frankland operates year-round and is free of charge.

The community has a small general store located at the dock where the ferry arrives at the island.

There is a Baptist church on the island that was completed in 1981.  However, there are records of a religious house in use until 1928, when the second of three churches was dedicated.

Gallery

See also
List of lighthouses in New Brunswick
List of communities in New Brunswick
List of islands of New Brunswick

References

Coastal islands of New Brunswick
Communities in Charlotte County, New Brunswick
Local service districts of Charlotte County, New Brunswick
Lighthouses in New Brunswick